Events in the year 2023 in Jordan.

Incumbents 

 Monarch – Abdullah II of Jordan
 Prime Minister of Jordan – Bisher Al-Khasawneh

Events

Scheduled 

 1 June – Wedding of Hussein, Crown Prince of Jordan, and Rajwa Al Saif

Deaths 

 3 January – Abdelsalam Majali, 97, Jordanian physician and politician, prime minister (1993–1995, 1997–1998).

References 

 

2023 in Jordan
Jordan
Jordan
2020s in Jordan
Years of the 21st century in Jordan